Béthune is a town in northern France.

Bethune may also refer to

Places
 Bethune Township, Ontario, Canada
 Bethune, Saskatchewan, Canada
 Arrondissement of Béthune, Pas-de-Calais, France
 Bethune, Colorado, U.S.
 Bethune, South Carolina, U.S.
 Bethune Beach, Florida, U.S.

People
Bethune (surname), people with the surname Bethune
Bethune baronets, the name of two baronetcies, one in the United Kingdom and the other in Nova Scotia
Clan Bethune, a Scottish clan
House of Bethune, a medieval French family
Norman Bethune, a Canadian surgeon, advocate of socialized medicine, and Communist

Schools
 Bethune College, in Kolkata, India
 Bethune-Cookman University, in Daytona Beach, Florida, U.S.
 Dr Norman Bethune Collegiate Institute, in Toronto, Ontario, Canada

Films
 Bethune, a 1964 documentary directed by Donald Brittain
Bethune (1977 film), a 1977 film about the life of Norman Bethune
Bethune: The Making of a Hero, a 1990 film about the life of Norman Bethune

Other uses
Béthune (river), in Normandy, France